Phalera sundana is a moth of the family Notodontidae. It is found in Sundaland, including Bali and Mindanao.

The wingspan is 45-54 for males and 55–59 mm for females.

External links
The Moths of Borneo

Notodontidae
Moths described in 1982